Mally may refer to:

 Mally Beauty, U.S. makeup company
 1179 Mally (formerly 1931 FD) asteroid named after Ernst Mally

People
 Ernst Mally (1879–1944), Austrian philosopher
 Franziska Mally (born 1916), Austrian swimmer
 Komlan Mally (born 1960), former Tongolese Prime Minister
 Remo Mally (born 1991), Austrian soccer player
 Mally Roncal (born 1972), American makeup artist
 Mally (born 1983), Japanese drummer for Exist Trace

See also
 Jamal (rapper) (born 1978) also called "Mally G"
 O'Malley (disambiguation)
 Malley
 Maley
 Maly (disambiguation)